The Pskov City Duma is the city duma of Pskov, Russia. A total of 25 deputies are elected for five-year terms.

History

The Pskov City Duma was originally established in 1785 as part of Catherine II's reforms on local government, with the first meeting being held in 1789.

Elections

2017

2022

References

Pskov